A military liaison element (MLE) is small group of special forces personnel, sometimes just one or two at a time, attached to embassies in Africa, Southeast Asia, South America, or elsewhere that terrorists are thought to be operating, planning attacks, raising money or seeking safe haven, especially those teams in the United States. MLEs report to the local US combat commanders and Special Operations Command (SOCOM) and not to the local ambassador or CIA station chief.

These units work to gather information on possible terror threats, but do not actively hunt down terrorists. In addition, MLEs are not undercover. SOCOM, under then Secretary of Defense Donald Rumsfeld, first deployed MLEs in 2003 under the name "Operational Control Elements" a term changed in 2005 because it was considered inappropriate and unpolitic by regional commanders and ambassadors.

MLEs were first introduced to the general public by a New York Times expose.

References

Special Operations Forces of the United States
United States military presence in other countries